The Bacheller-Brewer Model Home Estate is a historic house located at 1903 Lincoln Drive in Sarasota, Florida.

Description and history 
It was designed in the Mediterranean Revival style by locally prominent architect, Thomas Reed Martin in 1926. On February 10, 1992, it was added to the U.S. National Register of Historic Places.

References

External links
 Sarasota County listings at National Register of Historic Places
 Sarasota County listings at Florida's Office of Cultural and Historical Programs

Houses on the National Register of Historic Places in Sarasota County, Florida
Houses in Sarasota, Florida
Mediterranean Revival architecture in Florida
Houses completed in 1926